Belevi railway station is a railway station in the town of Belevi in Selçuk, Turkey. It was built between 2017 and 2019 as part of the Southern Line (Selçuk extension) of the IZBAN commuter rail system. On 10 April 2019, the station started to serve passengers.

References

Railway stations in İzmir Province
Selçuk District
Railway stations opened in 2019